Aleksandra Blinnikka (born 30 December 1992 in Vantaa) is a Finnish windsurfer. She started her international competition career in 2013 in Raceboard Class. Since then she has competed in Raceboard and RS:X Olympic Class events. 2020 she changed the discipline to the new IQFOIL Olympic class as it was chosen to be the new windsurfing olympic class in the next summer olympics 2024. She has twice won the Raceboard Worlds and the European Championships.

In 2018 and 2019 she was nominated as an Athlete of Vantaa. She was also one of the TOP-11 nominees for Sports Moment of the Year in the Finnish Sports Gala - Urheilugaala.

International Competition Records

IQFOIL Olympic Class 
 2022 26th in the iQFoil European Championship, Garda 
 2022 31st in the Princesa Sofia World Cup, Mallorca 
 2021 34th in the iQFoil European Championship, Marseille 
 2021 44th in the iQFoil World Championship, Silvaplana 
 2020 52nd Women in iQFoil International Games, Garda

RS:X Olympic Class 
 2019 RS:X Windsurfing World Championships 98th place

Raceboard World Championships 
 2019 Gold medalist
 2018 Gold medalist
 2017 Bronze medalist
 2015 Silver medalist
 2014 6th place
 2013 10th place

Raceboard European Championships 
 2019 Silver medalist
 2018 Gold medalist
 2015 Gold medalist
 2014 Bronze medalist

External links 
 Helsingin Sanomat - Aleksandra Blinnikka teki radalla töitä ”ihan hullun lailla” ja voitti jälleen purjelautailun MM-kultaa
 Yle - Blinnikka taisteli näpit jäässä purjelautailun EM-hopeaa
 Finnair - How To Stay Fit While Travelling
 Suomen Purjehdus ja Veneily - Vuoden Parhaat Palkittiin
 Mikä vuosi! Vantaalaispurjehtija nappasi MM-kullan lisäksi euroopanmestaruuden

References 

1992 births
Living people
Windsurfers
People from Vantaa